Burnett County is a county located in the U.S. state of Wisconsin. As of the 2020 census, the population was 16,526. Its county seat is Siren, with the majority of county governmental services located at the Burnett County Government Center. The county was created in 1856 and organized in 1865. The St. Croix Chippewa Indians of Wisconsin have reservation lands in Burnett County and are the county's largest employer.

Geography

Saginaw Lake is located in the county, south of the Namekagon River.

Adjacent counties
 Douglas County – northeast
 Washburn County – east
 Barron County – southeast
 Polk County – south
 Chisago County, Minnesota – southwest
 Pine County, Minnesota – west

Major highways
  Highway 35 (Wisconsin)
  Highway 48 (Wisconsin)
  Highway 70 (Wisconsin)
  Highway 77 (Wisconsin)
  Highway 87 (Wisconsin)

Buses
List of intercity bus stops in Wisconsin

Airports
 Burnett County Airport (KRZN) serves the county and surrounding communities.
 Grantsburg Municipal Airport (KGTG) enhances county service.

National protected area
 Saint Croix National Scenic Riverway (part)

Demographics

2020 census
As of the census of 2020, the population was 16,526. The racial makeup of the county was 89.3% White, 4.4% Native American, 0.4% Black or African American, 0.3% Asian, 0.1% Pacific Islander, 0.5% from other races, and 5.1% from two or more races. Ethnically, the population was 1.5% Hispanic or Latino of any race.

2000 census

As of the census of 2000, there were 15,674 people, 6,613 households, and 4,503 families residing in the county.  The population density was 19 people per square mile (7/km2). There were 12,582 housing units at an average density of 15 per square mile (6/km2). The racial makeup of the county was 93.25% White, 0.36% Black or African American, 4.45% Native American, 0.24% Asian, 0.07% Pacific Islander, 0.21% from other races, and 1.42% from two or more races. 0.77% of the population were Hispanic or Latino of any race. 28.9% were of German, 15.4% Swedish, 12.8% Norwegian and 6.3% Irish ancestry.

There were 6,613 households, out of which 25.10% had children under the age of 18 living with them, 56.20% were married couples living together, 7.50% had a female householder with no husband present, and 31.90% were non-families. 26.90% of all households were made up of individuals, and 12.20% had someone living alone who was 65 years of age or older. The average household size was 2.33 and the average family size was 2.80.

In the county, the population was spread out, with 22.10% under the age of 18, 6.00% from 18 to 24, 23.20% from 25 to 44, 28.40% from 45 to 64, and 20.30% who were 65 years of age or older. The median age was 44 years. For every 100 females there were 101.50 males. For every 100 females age 18 and over, there were 100.30 males.

In 2017, there were 118 births, giving a general fertility rate of 58.5 births per 1000 women aged 15–44, the 23rd lowest rate out of all 72 Wisconsin counties. Additionally, there were no reported induced abortions performed on women of Burnett County residence in 2017.

Communities
Burnett County is one of only three Wisconsin counties that have no incorporated cities. It is the only Wisconsin county to have villages but no cities.

Villages
 Grantsburg
 Siren (seat)
 Webster

Towns

 Anderson
 Blaine
 Daniels
 Dewey
 Grantsburg
 Jackson
 La Follette
 Lincoln
 Meenon
 Oakland
 Roosevelt
 Rusk
 Sand Lake
 Scott
 Siren
 Swiss
 Trade Lake
 Union
 Webb Lake
 West Marshland
 Wood River

Census-designated place
 Danbury

Unincorporated communities

 Alpha
 Bashaw
 Benson
 Branstad
 Coomer
 Falun
 Four Corners
 Gaslyn
 Hertel
 Lind
 Oakland
 Pole Cat Crossing (partial)
 Randall
 Riverside
 Timberland
 Trade Lake
 Trade River
 Webb Lake
 Woodland Corner
 Yellow Lake

Politics

See also
 Burnett County Airport
 National Register of Historic Places listings in Burnett County, Wisconsin
 USS Burnett County (LST-512)

References

Further reading
 Peet, Ed. L. Burnett County, Wisconsin: A Pamphlet Descriptive of Northern Wisconsin in General and of Burnett County in Detail. Grantsburg, Wis.: Burnett County Board of Immigration, 1902.

External links
 Burnett County government website
 Burnett County map from the Wisconsin Department of Transportation
 Brief History of Burnett County
 Fort Folle Avoine Historical Park

 
1865 establishments in Wisconsin
Populated places established in 1865